Kurosaki Station (黒崎駅) is a railway station in Yahatanishi-ku, Kitakyushu serving Kagoshima Main Line, Fukuhoku Yutaka Line and Chikuhō Electric Railroad Line. It was first opened in 1891. Express trains, including the Sonic, stop here.

Lines 
JR Kyūshū
Kagoshima Main Line
Fukuhoku Yutaka Line
Chikuhō Electric Railroad
Chikuhō Electric Railroad Line

JR limited express trains
 Sonic (Hakata - Yanagigaura/Ōita/Saiki)
 Nichirin Seagaia (Hakata - Miyazaki Kūkō)
 Kirameki (Mojikō/Kokura - Hakata)

Station facilities

JR Kyūshū

Overview
JR Kurosaki Station is the station serving the Kagoshima Main Line and is the terminus of Fukuhoku Yutaka Line. The station consist of 2 islands serving four tracks and handles an average of 15,000 passengers a day. At the south exit of the station there is a pedway that also serves as a station square, connecting the Izutsuya department store on the east side with the commercial area on the south side.

Station layout

Adjacent stations 

|-
|colspan=5 style="text-align:center;" |Kyushu Railway Company

Chikuhō Electric Railroad

Overview
Kurosaki-Ekimae Station is the terminus of Chikuhō Electric Railroad Line opened on 15 July 1911. The station consist of 3 platforms serving two tracks and handles an average of 8,000 passengers a day.

Adjacent station

Railway stations in Fukuoka Prefecture
Buildings and structures in Kitakyushu
Railway stations in Japan opened in 1891
Railway stations in Japan opened in 1911